Maia Nenkova Martcheva-Drashanska is a Bulgarian-American mathematical biologist known for her books on population dynamics and epidemiology. She is a professor of mathematics at the University of Florida, where she is also affiliated with the department of biology.

Education and career
Martcheva earned a master's degree in mathematics from the University of Sofia in 1988.
She completed her Ph.D. in applied mathematics in 1998 at Purdue University. Her dissertation, in population dynamics, was An Age-Structured Two-Sex Population Model, and was supervised by Fabio Augusto Milner.

After postdoctoral research at the University of Minnesota, she became an instructor at the Brooklyn Polytechnic Institute in 1999. After taking several additional visiting faculty positions, she moved to the University of Florida as an assistant professor in 2003.

Books
Martcheva is the author of the book An Introduction to Mathematical Epidemiology (Texts in Applied Mathematics 61, Springer, 2016).

With Mimmo Ianelli and Fabio A. Milner, she is also the author of Gender-Structured Population Modeling: Mathematical Methods, Numerics, and Simulations (Frontiers in Applied Mathematics, 31, Society for Industrial and Applied Mathematics, 2005).

References

External links
Home page

Year of birth missing (living people)
Living people
20th-century American mathematicians
21st-century American mathematicians
Bulgarian mathematicians
Bulgarian women mathematicians
American women mathematicians
Purdue University alumni
University of Florida faculty
20th-century women mathematicians
21st-century women mathematicians
20th-century American women
21st-century American women